Namon Arthur Washington (June 20, 1894 – May, 1971), nicknamed "Cy", was an American baseball outfielder in the Negro leagues. He played with several teams from 1920 to 1930, playing mostly with the Indianapolis ABCs and the Hilldale Club.

References

External links
 and Baseball-Reference Black Baseball stats and Seamheads

1894 births
1971 deaths
Brooklyn Royal Giants players
Hilldale Club players
Indianapolis ABCs players
Lincoln Giants players
Philadelphia Tigers players
Baseball players from Texas
People from Hallettsville, Texas
Baseball outfielders
20th-century African-American sportspeople